Franklin I. Gamwell is a scholar of the philosophy of religion, Christian theology, and philosophical ethics. He is the Shailer Mathews Distinguished Service Professor Emeritus of Religious Ethics, the Philosophy of Religions, and Theology at the Divinity School of the University of Chicago, where he also has served as dean. He is a Presbyterian minister (B.D., Union Theological Seminary) with a strong interest in democracy and justice.

Gamwell also serves on the board of directors of Protestants for the Common Good, a nonprofit education and advocacy organization based in Chicago.

Selected works 

 Democracy on Purpose: Justice and the Reality of God
 The Divine Good: Modern Moral Theory and the Necessity of God
 The Meaning of Religious Freedom: Modern Politics and the Democratic Resolution
 Politics as a Christian Vocation: Faith and Democracy Today

References

American Presbyterians
Philosophers of religion
Living people
Year of birth missing (living people)
Union Theological Seminary (New York City) alumni
University of Chicago faculty
Fellows of the American Academy of Arts and Sciences